Tractor Drivers is a 1939 Soviet comedy drama film directed by Ivan Pyryev.

Plot 
In the 1930s, the demobilized tank driver Klim Yarko returns to his kolkhoz on the Ukrainian steppe, where Mariana Bazhan works as the master of speed plowing. This results in her having a lot of admirers, which she does not appreciate. To dissuade her suitors, Mariana asks Nazar Duma to pretend to be her fiancé.

Starring 
 Marina Ladynina as Maryana Bazhan
 Nikolay Kryuchkov as Klim Yarko
 Boris Andreyev as Nazar Duma
 Stepan Kayukov as Kirill Petrovich, head of the collective farm
 Pyotr Aleynikov as Savka
 Vladimir Kolchin as Kharitosha
 Olga Borovikova as Franya
 R. Dneprova-Chajka as Markovna
 Pyotr Valerianov as Granddad
 Alexei Dolinin as Firefighter 
 Pyotr Savin as tankman, Klim's friend  
 Artavazd Kefchiyan as tankman, Klim's friend

Cultural influence 
The March of the Soviet Tankmen  from this film was widely used in pre-war Soviet propaganda, while other tunes became popular songs, and are still performed.

Tractor Drivers 2 was a parody film made in 1991, whose plot is loosely based on that of Tractor Drivers.

References

External links 

1939 films
1930s Russian-language films
Soviet comedy-drama films
1939 comedy-drama films
Soviet black-and-white films
Films set in Ukraine
Films shot in Ukraine
Films directed by Ivan Pyryev
Mosfilm films